The Sachigo River is a river in the Hudson Bay drainage basin in Kenora District in Northwestern Ontario, Canada. It is a tributary of the Severn River.

Course
The Sachigo River begins at Broadside Lake and flows northeast through Pasateko Lake, past the Sachigo Hills, to Sachigo Lake, the location of the Sachigo Lake First Nation and the Sachigo Lake Airport, and where it takes in the right tributary Morrison River. It then heads north, past the Wetiko Hills, to Little Sachigo Lake, exits the lake east and heads once again northeast. The river divides into two branches, takes in the Sherman River on the left branch, then recombines. It continues northeast to reach its mouth at the Severn River, which flows to Hudson Bay.

Tributaries
Beaver Stone River (left)
Wapaseese River (right)
Thorne River (left)
Sherman River (left)
Sachigo Lake
Morrison River (right)
Rottenfish River (right)

See also
List of rivers of Ontario

References

Sources

 Shows the river course.

External links
Image of the Sachigo River, given as an example of a glacial spillway; at the Canadian Landscapes Photo Collection, Geological Survey of Canada

Canadian Heritage Rivers
Rivers of Kenora District
Tributaries of Hudson Bay